Stewart v. United States may refer to:

 Stewart v. United States (1855), 
 Stewart v. United States (1907), 
 Stewart v. United States (1942), 
 Stewart v. United States (1961), on a defendant's Fifth Amendment rights

See also 
 United States v. Stewart (disambiguation)